Loafer's Glory may refer to:
 Loafers Glory, North Carolina
 Loafer's Glory, a 1997 album by Utah Phillips and Mark Ross; also the name of a radio program hosted by Phillips from 1997–2001